Callicorixa is a genus of water boatmen in the family Corixidae. There are about nine described species in Callicorixa.

Species
These nine species belong to the genus Callicorixa:
 Callicorixa alaskensis Hungerford, 1926
 Callicorixa audeni Hungerford, 1928 (Auden's waterboatman)
 Callicorixa gebleri (Fieber, 1848)
 Callicorixa praeusta (Fieber, 1848)
 Callicorixa producta (Reuter, 1880)
 Callicorixa scudderi Jansson, 1979
 Callicorixa tetoni Hungerford, 1948
 Callicorixa vulnerata (Uhler, 1861)
 Callicorixa wollastoni (Douglas & Scott, 1865)

References

Further reading

External links

 

Articles created by Qbugbot
Corixini
Heteroptera genera